Lapwing Publications is a publisher based in Belfast and specialising in poetry.

History 

The press was founded in 1988 by Dennis and Rene Greig.  Since then it has published over a hundred and fifty poetry collections. It is known for its openness with regards to publishing innovative poetry. Lapwing Publications publishes in a variety of formats: pamphlets, chapbooks, and soft back books. Lapwing Publications sells some of their pamphlets in E-Book format and plans to eventually have the entire back catalogue in electronic form.

Lapwing mainly publishes poets from Ireland, both north and south of the border.  It has also published poets from other parts of Europe, as well as Canada and the US.

According to MEAS report providing statistics for Irish poetry publications, Lapwing Publications in 2018 was the joint-second most prolific poetry press on the Island of Ireland.

Lapwing has published some of Ireland's best known authors.

Notable poets published by the press 

Tony Bailie
Patrick Chapman
Fred Johnston
Hugh McFadden 
Padraic Fiacc
Robert Greacen
Jean O'Brien
Desmond O'Grady
Adam Rudden
James Simmons
Todd Swift

References

External links
 
 Lapwing on the National Poetry Library of the UK website
 Wexford writer Jim Maguire to launch his Korean Stories' - Independent.ie
 Guest Column: Lapwing and Google | Irish Publishing News

Publishing companies of the United Kingdom
Publishing companies of Ireland
Irish poetry
Poetry publishers
Literary publishing companies
Book publishing companies of Ireland

https://intothevoidmagazine.com/2018/04/30/vertical-montage-csilla-toldy/